Common names: Yucatán hognosed pitviper.

Porthidium yucatanicum is a venomous pitviper species found in Mexico. No subspecies are currently recognized.

Description
Adults are usually  in total length, although some specimens may exceed . The females tend to be larger than the males. Moderately stout and terrestrial.

Geographic range
Found in the northern half of the Yucatán Peninsula in Mexico. The type locality given is "Chichen Itza, Yucatán" [Mexico].

Conservation status
This species is classified as Least Concern (LC) on the IUCN Red List of Threatened Species (v3.1, 2001). Species are listed as such due to their wide distribution, presumed large population, or because it is unlikely to be declining fast enough to qualify for listing in a more threatened category. The population trend is unknown. Year assessed: 2007.

References

Further reading
 Smith, H.M. 1941. On the Mexican snakes of the genus Trimeresurus. Zoologica 26: 61-64. (Trimeresurus yucatanicus)

External links
 

yucatanicum
Snakes of North America
Endemic reptiles of Mexico
Fauna of the Yucatán Peninsula
Reptiles described in 1941